Events from the year 1781 in Ireland.

Incumbent
Monarch: George III

Events
8 August – construction of The Custom House, Dublin, to the design of James Gandon, begins.

Arts and literature
 First annual Granard harp festival.

Births
6 February – John Keane, 1st Baron Keane, British Army Lieutenant-General (died 1844).
25 December? – Sydney Owenson, novelist (died 1859).
William Benjamin Sarsfield Taylor, painter (died 1850).

Deaths
26 September – Andrew Lewis, pioneer and surveyor, soldier from Virginia (born 1720).

References

 
1780s in Ireland
Years of the 18th century in Ireland
Ireland